Reginald Thomas Hodgkins (7 January 1903 – July 1927) was an English footballer who played in the Football League for Stoke City.

Career
Hodgkins was born in Nuneaton and played for Hinckley United before joining Stoke City in 1925. He played twice in 1925–26 and three times in 1926–27. However, in July 1927 Hodgkins fell ill and died at the age of just 24.

Career statistics
Source:

Honours
 Stoke City
Football League Third Division North champions: 1926–27

References

English footballers
Stoke City F.C. players
English Football League players
1903 births
1927 deaths
Hinckley United F.C. players
Association football central defenders